Donald Walsh (born 27 March 1948) is a retired Irish Marathon runner and coach.

Track career
Walsh attended Villanova University.  He also competed at the 1972 Olympics.

Cross country career
He earned a team silver at the 1979 IAAF World Cross Country Championships and competed in the event nine times.

Coaching career
He is the coach of Lizzie Lee.  He has also advised Sonia O'Sullivan.

References

Living people
1948 births
Athletes from the Republic of Ireland
Athletes (track and field) at the 1972 Summer Olympics
Irish male long-distance runners
Irish male marathon runners
Olympic athletes of Ireland